is a 2001 Japanese musical comedy horror film directed by Takashi Miike, with screenplay by Kikumi Yamagishi. It is loosely based on the South Korean film The Quiet Family. The film is a surreal horror-comedy in the farce tradition, which includes claymation sequences, musical and dance numbers, a karaoke-style sing-along scene, and dream sequences.

The film won a Special Jury Prize for its director at the 2004 Gérardmer Film Festival and has received generally positive reviews from critics.

Plot
The Katakuris are a four-generation family of failures: patriarch Masao Katakuri (Kenji Sawada), his wife Terue (Keiko Matsuzaka), his father Jinpei (Tetsurō Tamba), his formerly criminal son Masayuki (Shinji Takeda), his divorced daughter Shizue (Naomi Nishida), her child Yurie (Tamaki Miyazaki, who narrates the film), and their dog, Pochi. The family uses the father's redundancy pay to purchase a large old home situated on a former garbage dump near Mount Fuji that they have named the ‘White Lover's Inn'.  They have the intention of converting it into a bed and breakfast, since the road running nearby is supposed to be expanded up to the house, which would bring many guests and tourists. However, the road hasn't been expanded yet and the Katakuris subsequently have no guests. When one finally shows up, he subsequently commits suicide during the night, and the Katakuris make the decision to save their business by burying the body and concealing the death. The second guest, a Sumo wrestler, also dies of a heart attack during a tryst with his much younger girlfriend, who also dies.

Somehow, each of their guests ends up dead—by suicide, accident or murder—and pretty soon the bodies in the back yard begin to pile up. The Katakuris soon find themselves sucked into a nightmare of lies and fear.

Meanwhile, the recently divorced daughter falls in love with a man calling himself Richard Sagawa (Kiyoshiro Imawano), a U.S. naval officer who claims to be the nephew of Queen Elizabeth II herself. Just when Richard stumbles onto a clue that might lead him to uncover the string of disappearing guests, a nearby volcano begins rumbling to life.

Cast

Release
The Happiness of the Katakuris was first shown in Japan at the Tokyo International Film Festival in October 2001. The Happiness of the Katakuris was released theatrically in Japan on February 16, 2002.

Reception
On Rotten Tomatoes, the film has an approval rating of 64%, based on 28 reviews, with an average rating of 6.2/10. The site's critical consensus reads: "If nothing else, Happiness of the Katakuris scores points for its delirious, over-the-top originality." On Metacritic, the film has a weighted average score of 60 out of 100, based on 11 critics, indicating "Mixed or average reviews". Kim Newman (Sight & Sound) stated that "Like many of Miike's efforts...[the film] feels all too much like the work of someone who had seven other films on his mind, not all of which he crams into his current project". Newman commented on the acting, noting that "The performances are all fine, but the individual players sometimes seem to be competing for screen space rather than building an ensemble." The review found that the "one-damn-thing-after-another progression straggles on a reel too long, delaying the inevitable and pleasing volcanic eruption finale with a hostage-taking psychopath who only pops in to drag things out until the big bang."

A second review in Sight & Sound described the film as "Wilful, kitsch and eccentric" and "Miike's oddest and most infuriating film yet."

Notes

References

External links 
 
 
 
 

2001 horror films
2001 comedy horror films
Japanese comedy horror films
Japanese musical comedy films
2000s musical comedy films
Japanese remakes of South Korean films
Horror film remakes
Films directed by Takashi Miike
2000s Japanese-language films
Musical film remakes
2001 films
Shochiku films
Discotek Media
2001 comedy films
2000s Japanese films